"Pounding" is the second single from English band Doves' second studio album, The Last Broadcast (2002). The single was released on 22 July 2002 in the UK on CD and 10-inch vinyl, reaching number 21 on the UK Singles Chart. An EP was released for the song in Japan the same year to coincide with Doves' 2002 Japan tour dates. The music video was directed by Julian House and Julian Gibbs at Intro, the same team that directed the band's previous video "There Goes the Fear."

The B-side, "Willow's Song", is found on the Japanese EP as the full-length version. It includes the 'false start' and runs 4:20. The version of the song found on the next single "Caught by the River" is an 'edit' which cuts out the intro and runs 3:58. The track was used in the 2010 Winter Olympics With Glowing Hearts advertisement campaign in Vancouver. An instrumental version is also played regularly in the Manchester City stadium before football matches.

Track listings

Charts

References

2002 singles
Doves (band) songs
Heavenly Recordings singles
Songs written by Jimi Goodwin
Songs written by Andy Williams (Doves)
Songs written by Jez Williams